Jim Warren (22 July 1903 – 8 April 1977) was an Australian rules footballer who played with Geelong in the Victorian Football League (VFL). He was born in Queenscliff. 

Warren was Geelong's third leading goal-kicker in 1925 with 24 goals and was a rover in their premiership team that year. He spent three more seasons at Geelong.

Sorrento career 
By 1929 Warren was playing coach at Sorrento on the Victorian Mornington Peninsula in the Peninsula Football Association. The concluded in a unique 5-week finals series and a premiership.

References

External links
 
 

1903 births
Australian rules footballers from Victoria (Australia)
Geelong Football Club players
Geelong Football Club Premiership players
Port Fairy Football Club players
1977 deaths
One-time VFL/AFL Premiership players